Ruth Katrin Gemmell (born October 1967) is an English actress. She starred in the film Fever Pitch in 1997 which was followed by supporting roles in television series EastEnders, Casualty, Home Fires and Penny Dreadful. She has played Carly Beaker, the mother of title character in the Tracy Beaker franchise since 2004. In 2020, she began playing Lady Violet Bridgerton in the Netflix series Bridgerton.

Early life and education
Ruth Katrin Gemmell was born in October 1967 in Bristol and grew up in County Durham, first in Barnard Castle before moving to Darlington with her mother upon her parents' divorce. She has three brothers. She attended Polam Hall School. Gemmell later moved to London, where her father lived, to pursue acting. She trained at the Webber Douglas Academy of Dramatic Art.

Career
Gemmell has played roles in both theatre and TV dramas. She played the leading female role Fever Pitch, based on Nick Hornby's novel of the same name, starring opposite Colin Firth and had another leading role in the comedy/drama 2 January (2006). She played the recurring character of Detective Constable Kerry Cox in the first series of the BBC police procedural Silent Witness, which premiered in 1996. She returned to the series as different characters in 2006 and 2014.

In 2004, she starred in Tracy Beaker's Movie of Me as the mother of the title character. Carly had a new boyfriend who was abusive towards her when she was around three or four years old, leading her to spend life in a children's home. From January 2009 she became a recurring character in EastEnders as Debra Dean, the mother of a teenage girl who, similar to her role in Tracy Beaker's Movie of Me, abandoned her daughter when she was an infant. In August 2009, she starred as Rebecca Sands in two episodes of The Bill.

Gemmell has appeared three times in the BBC's police drama Waking the Dead, playing two different characters. Her first appearance was in 2002 in the episode Special Relationships as DI Jess Worral, a former lover of DSI Boyd. She next appeared in the episode Sins of seventh season in 2008 as Linda Cummings, an exceptionally intelligent serial killer. Gemmell reprised the role of Cummings in Endgame, the fourth episode of the eighth season of the show. The storyline had Cummings manipulating Boyd and revealed that Cummings' accomplice was responsible for the drugs overdose that killed Boyd's son Luke. The role reprisal of Cummings is a first in the show's history. Gemmell starred in Episode 8 of Jimmy McGovern's BBC drama Moving On playing the role of Joanne, in November 2010. In November 2011, Gemmell played Lady Shonagon in the adaptation for BBC Radio 4 Woman's Hour of The Pillow Book, by Robert Forrest. She appeared as Jen, the wife of an adulterous civil servant, in Channel 4 drama Utopia, in early 2013.

In 2015, Gemmell appeared in five episodes of the television series Penny Dreadful as Octavia Putney. In 2020, she began playing Lady Violet Bridgerton in the Netflix series Bridgerton.

In 2021, Ruth Gemmell returned as Carly Beaker for My Mum Tracy Beaker, when Tracy and Jess move in with Sean, and Cam and Carly argue about Tracy.

Personal life
Gemmell was married in Westminster, London, in 1997 to actor Ray Stevenson, whom she met in 1995 during the filming of TV drama Band of Gold. The couple divorced in 2005.

Filmography

Film

Television

Theatre

Radio

Awards and nominations

References

External links 
 

Living people
1967 births
21st-century English actresses
20th-century English actresses
Actors from County Durham
Alumni of the Webber Douglas Academy of Dramatic Art
English film actresses
English radio actresses
English stage actresses
English television actresses
People from Barnard Castle
People from Darlington